Nishtha Jaswal is an Indian academic and administrator. As of 2022, she was the Vice Chancellor of Himachal Pradesh National Law University, Shimla. She is the first woman Vice-Chancellor of HPNLU, Shimla.

Education and career 
Jaswal did her Ph.D. in 1989 from Panjab University. She started her teaching career from 1986. She was also invited as visiting professor by the British Academy, London in 1992.

Books

Personal life 
Her husband, Paramjit Singh Jaswal, is the currently the Vice Chancellor of SRM University, Haryana.

References

1959 births
Living people
Indian legal writers
Scholars from Punjab, India